Events from the year 1969 in the United States.

Incumbents

Federal government 
 President: Lyndon B. Johnson (D–Texas) (until January 20), Richard Nixon (R–California) (starting January 20)
 Vice President: Hubert Humphrey (D–Minnesota) (until January 20), Spiro Agnew (R–Maryland) (starting January 20)
 Chief Justice: Earl Warren (California) (until June 23), Warren E. Burger (Minnesota) (starting June 23)
 Speaker of the House of Representatives: John William McCormack (D–Massachusetts)
 Senate Majority Leader: Mike Mansfield (D–Montana)
 Congress: 90th (until January 3), 91st (starting January 3)

Events

January
 January 1 – In college football, Ohio State defeats USC in the Rose Bowl Game to win the national title for the 1968 season.
 January 9 – In Washington, D.C., the Smithsonian Institution displays the art of Winslow Homer for 6 weeks.
 January 12 – Super Bowl III: The New York Jets of the American Football League defeat the heavily favored Baltimore Colts of the National Football League 16–7.
 January 13 – Elvis Presley steps into American Studios in Memphis, Tennessee, recording "Long Black Limousine" thus beginning the recording of what becomes his landmark comeback sessions for the albums "From Elvis In Memphis" and "Back in Memphis." The sessions yield the popular and critically acclaimed singles "Suspicious Minds", "In the Ghetto" and "Kentucky Rain."
 January 14
 USS Enterprise fire: An explosion aboard aircraft carrier  near Hawaii kills 27 and injures 314.
 CBS greenlights Peanuts as a primetime television series. It runs for one season commencing April 10.
 January 16 – Ten paintings are defaced in New York's Metropolitan Museum of Art.
 January 18 – In Washington, D.C., the Smithsonian Institution displays the art of Winslow Homer for 6 weeks.
 January 20 – Richard Nixon is sworn in as the 37th President of the United States, and Spiro Agnew is sworn in as Vice President of the United States.
 January 26 – Elvis Presley steps into American Studios in Memphis, Tennessee, recording "Long Black Limousine", thus beginning the recording of what becomes his landmark comeback sessions for the albums From Elvis in Memphis and Back in Memphis. The sessions yield the popular and critically acclaimed singles "Suspicious Minds", "In the Ghetto", and "Kentucky Rain".
 January 27 – The modern-day powerhouse of the Hetch Hetchy Project at Moccasin, California, rated at 100,000 kVA, is completed and placed in operation. On February 7, the original is removed from service.
 January 28 – 1969 Santa Barbara oil spill: A blowout on Union Oil's Platform A in the Dos Cuadras Offshore Oil Field spills 80,000 to 100,000 barrels of crude oil into a channel and onto the beaches of Santa Barbara County in Southern California; on February 5 the oil spill closes Santa Barbara's harbor. The incident inspires Wisconsin Senator Gaylord Nelson to organize the first Earth Day in 1970.

February
 February 5 
 Aquanaut Berry L. Cannon dies of carbon dioxide poisoning while attempting to repair the SEALAB III habitat off San Clemente Island, California.
 Four hundred Major League Baseball players boycott spring training over owners' refusal to increase their pension-fund contributions along with television broadcast revenues.
 The U.S. population reaches 200 million.
 The controversial television show Turn-On premieres on the ABC network and is canceled after one episode following protests by viewers and ABC affiliate stations.
 February 8 – The last issue of The Saturday Evening Post in its original form hits magazine stands after 147 years.
 February 9 – The Boeing 747 makes its maiden flight, from Paine Field at Everett, Washington.
 February 24 
The Mariner 6 Mars probe is launched from Cape Canaveral Air Force Station.
Tinker v. Des Moines Independent Community School District: The U.S. Supreme Court rules that the First Amendment applies to public schools.
 February 26 – The baseball players' boycott of spring training is settled, largely on their terms.

March
 March 3 
In a Los Angeles court, Sirhan Sirhan admits that he killed presidential candidate Robert F. Kennedy.
Apollo program: NASA launches Apollo 9 (James McDivitt, David Scott, Rusty Schweickart) to test the Apollo Lunar Module.
 March 4 – Arrest warrants are issued by a Florida court for Jim Morrison on charges of indecent exposure during a Doors concert three days earlier.
 March 10 – In Memphis, Tennessee, James Earl Ray pleads guilty to assassinating Martin Luther King Jr. (he later retracts his guilty plea).
 The United States Navy establishes the Navy Fighter Weapons School (also known as Top Gun) at Naval Air Station Miramar.
 The novel The Godfather by Mario Puzo is first distributed to booksellers by the publisher G. P. Putnam's Sons.
 March 13 – Apollo program: Apollo 9 returns safely to Earth after testing the Lunar Module.
 March 18 – Operation Breakfast, the covert bombing of Cambodia by U.S. planes, begins. 
 March 28 – Former United States General and President Dwight D. Eisenhower dies after a long illness in the Walter Reed Army Medical Center, Washington, D.C..

April
 April – A grassroots movement of Berkeley community members seizes an empty lot owned by the University of California to begin the formation of "People's Park."
 April 9 – The Harvard University Administration Building is seized by close to 300 students, mostly members of the Students for a Democratic Society. Before the takeover ends, 45 are injured and 184 are arrested.
 April 14 – The 41st Academy Awards ceremony, the first with no official host since 1939, is held at Dorothy Chandler Pavilion in Los Angeles. Carol Reed's Oliver! receives 11 nominations and wins five awards, including Best Picture and Best Director for Reed. Stanley Kubrick also receives his only Oscar win - Best Visual Effects for 2001: A Space Odyssey.
 April 20 – A grassroots movement of Berkeley community members seizes an empty lot owned by the University of California, to begin the formation of "People's Park".

May

 May 1 – Semiconductor company AMD is founded.
 May 10 – Zip to Zap, a harbinger of the Woodstock Concert, ends with the dispersal and eviction of youth and young adults at Zap, North Dakota, by the National Guard.
 May 15 – A teenager known as 'Robert R.' dies in St. Louis, Missouri, of a baffling medical condition. In 1984 it will be identified as the first confirmed case of HIV/AIDS in North America.
 May 18 – Apollo program: Apollo 10 (Tom Stafford, Gene Cernan, John Young) is launched, on the full dress-rehearsal for the Moon landing.
 May 20 – United States National Guard helicopters spray skin-stinging powder on protesters in Berkeley, California, in the aftermath of the People's Park unrest.
 May 21 – Shirley Chisholm appears before Congress to speak about prejudices facing women in the workforce and the need for equal rights for women.
 May 22 – Apollo program: Apollo 10's lunar module flies to within 15,400 m of the Moon's surface.
 May 25 – Midnight Cowboy, an X-rated, Oscar-winning John Schlesinger film, is released.
 May 26 – Apollo program: Apollo 10 returns to Earth, after a successful 8-day test of all the components needed for the upcoming first manned Moon landing.

June
 June 3 – Melbourne-Evans collision: The Australian aircraft carrier  collides with the U.S. destroyer  in the South China Sea; 74 U.S. sailors are killed.
 June 8 – U.S. President Richard Nixon and South Vietnamese President Nguyễn Văn Thiệu meet at Midway Island. Nixon announces that 25,000 U.S. troops will be withdrawn by September.
 June 18–22 – The National Convention of the Students for a Democratic Society (SDS), held in Chicago, collapses, and the Weatherman faction seizes control of the SDS National Office. Thereafter, any activity run from the National Office or bearing the name of SDS is Weatherman-controlled.
 June 23 – Warren E. Burger is sworn in as Chief Justice of the United States by retiring Chief Justice Earl Warren.
 June 28 – The Stonewall riots in New York City mark the start of the modern gay rights movement in the U.S.

July
 July 4 – Michael Mageau and Darlene Ferrin are shot at Blue Rock Springs in California. They are the second (known) victims of the Zodiac Killer. Mageau survives the attack while Ferrin is pronounced dead-on-arrival at Richmond Medical Center.
 July 8 – Vietnam War: The first U.S. troop withdrawals are made.
 July 14 – The $500, $1,000, $5,000, and $10,000 bills are officially removed from circulation.
 July 16 – Apollo program: Apollo 11 (Neil Armstrong, Buzz Aldrin, Michael Collins) lifts off from Cape Kennedy toward the first human landing on the Moon.
 July 17 – The New York Times publicly takes back the ridicule of the rocket scientist Robert H. Goddard published on January 13, 1920, that stated that spaceflight is impossible.
 July 18 – Chappaquiddick incident – Ted Kennedy drives off a bridge after leaving a party on Chappaquiddick Island, Massachusetts. Mary Jo Kopechne, a former campaign aide to his brother Robert, dies in the early morning hours of July 19 in the submerged car.
 July 20 – Apollo program Moon landing: At 3:17 pm ET (20:17 UTC) Apollo 11's Lunar Module Eagle lands on the Moon's surface. At 10:56 pm ET (02:56 UTC July 21), an estimated 650 million people worldwide watch in awe as Neil Armstrong takes the first historic steps by a human on the surface.
 July 21 – A. D. King, younger brother of Martin Luther King Jr., dies at age 38.
 July 24 – Apollo program: Armstrong, Aldrin, and Collins return safely to Earth after the first landing on the Moon.
 July 25 – Vietnam War: U.S. President Richard Nixon declares the Nixon Doctrine, stating that the United States now expects its Asian allies to take care of their own military defense. This starts the "Vietnamization" of the war.
 July 26 – The New York Chapter of the Young Lords is founded to fight for empowerment of Puerto Ricans.
 July 30 – Vietnam War: U.S. President Richard Nixon makes an unscheduled visit to South Vietnam, meeting with President Nguyễn Văn Thiệu and U.S. military commanders.

August
 August 4 – Vietnam War: At the apartment of French intermediary Jean Sainteny in Paris, U.S. representative Henry Kissinger and North Vietnamese representative Xuan Thuy begin secret peace negotiations. They eventually fail since both sides cannot agree to any terms.
 August 5 – Mariner program: Mariner 7 makes its closest fly-by of Mars (3,524 kilometers).
 August 9 – 
 August 9 – Members of a cult led by Charles Manson murder Sharon Tate (who was 8 months pregnant) and her friends: Folgers coffee heiress Abigail Folger, Wojciech Frykowski, and Hollywood hairstylist Jay Sebring at Roman Polanski's home in Los Angeles. Also killed was Steven Parent, leaving from a visit to the home's caretaker. More than 100 stab wounds are found on the victims, except for Parent, who had been shot almost as soon as the Manson Family entered the property.
 August 10 – The Manson Family kills Leno and Rosemary LaBianca, wealthy Los Angeles business people.
 August 15 – Captain D's is founded as "Mr. D's Seafood and Hamburgers" by Ray Danner with its first location opening in Donelson, Tennessee.
 August 15–18 – The Woodstock Festival is held in upstate New York, featuring some of the era's top rock musicians.
 August 17 – Category 5 Hurricane Camille, the most powerful tropical cyclonic system at landfall in history, hits the Mississippi coast, killing 248 people and causing US$1.5 billion in damage (1969 dollars).
 August 20 – Florissant Fossil Beds National Monument is established in Florissant, Colorado.
 August 21 – Donald and Doris Fisher open the first Gap store on Ocean Avenue in San Francisco.

September
 September 2 – The first automatic teller machine in the United States is installed in Rockville Centre, New York.
 September 5 – My Lai Massacre: Lieutenant William Calley is charged with six counts of premeditated murder, for the deaths of 109 Vietnamese civilians in My Lai.
 September 6 – Children's TV series H.R. Pufnstuf begins its run on NBC. It was also a segment in The Banana Splits Adventure Hour season 2.
 September 9 – Allegheny Airlines Flight 853 DC-9 collides in flight with a Piper PA-28, and crashes near Fairland, Indiana.
 September 13 – Scooby-Doo, Where Are You!, Dastardly and Muttley in Their Flying Machines, and The Perils of Penelope Pitstop are broadcast for the first time on CBS.
 September 14 – Men who were born during the years from 1944 to 1951, and who celebrate their birthdays on this day, mark the occasion without being aware that September 14 will be the first date selected in the new U.S. draft lottery on December 1.
 September 20 – The last Warner Bros. cartoon of the original theatrical Looney Tunes series is released: Injun Trouble.
 September 23 – Butch Cassidy and the Sundance Kid, a film starring Paul Newman and Robert Redford, opens to limited release in the U.S.
 September 24 – The Chicago Eight trial begins in Chicago, Illinois.
 September 25 – DHL, a worldwide logistics and delivery service, is founded in California.
 September 26 – The Brady Bunch premieres on ABC.

October

 October 1 – The 5.6  Santa Rosa earthquake shook the North Bay area of California with a maximum Mercalli intensity of VII (Very strong). This first event in a doublet earthquake was followed two hours later by a 5.7  shock. Total financial losses from the events was $8.35 million.
 October 2 – A 1.2 megaton thermonuclear device is tested at Amchitka Island, Alaska. This test is code-named Project Milrow, the 11th test of the Operation Mandrel 1969–1970 underground nuclear test series. This test is known as a "calibration shot" to test if the island is fit for larger underground nuclear detonations.
 October 9–12 – Days of Rage: In Chicago, the United States National Guard is called in to control demonstrations involving the radical Weathermen, in connection with the "Chicago Eight" Trial.
 October 11 – The Zodiac Killer murders taxi cab driver Paul Stine in San Francisco, California.
 October 15 – Vietnam War: Hundreds of thousands of people take part in antiwar demonstrations across the United States called by the National Mobilization Committee to End the War in Vietnam.
 October 16 – The "miracle" New York Mets win the World Series, beating the heavily favored Baltimore Orioles 4 games to 1.
 October 17
 Willard S. Boyle and George Smith invent the CCD at Bell Laboratories (30 years later, this technology is widely used in digital cameras).
 Fourteen black athletes are dismissed from the University of Wyoming football team for wearing black armbands into their coach's office. 
 October 31 – Wal-Mart incorporates as Wal-Mart Stores, Inc.

November
 November 3 – Vietnam War: U.S. President Richard Nixon addresses the nation on television and radio, asking the "silent majority" to join him in solidarity with the Vietnam War effort, and to support his policies. Vice President Spiro T. Agnew denounces the President's critics as "an effete corps of impudent snobs" and "nattering nabobs of negativism".
 November 9 – A group of American Indians, led by Richard Oakes, seizes Alcatraz Island as a symbolic gesture, offering to buy the property for $24 from the U.S. government. A longer occupation begins 11 days later. The act inspires a wave of renewed Indian pride and government reform.
 November 10 – The children's television show Sesame Street premieres on NET (now PBS).
 November 12 – Vietnam War – My Lai Massacre: Independent investigative journalist Seymour Hersh breaks the My Lai story.
 November 14 – Apollo program: NASA launches Apollo 12 (Pete Conrad, Richard Gordon, Alan Bean), the second manned mission to the Moon.
 November 15
Cold War: The Soviet submarine K-19 collides with the American submarine  in the Barents Sea.
Vietnam War: In Washington, D.C., 250,000–500,000 protesters stage a peaceful demonstration against the war, including a symbolic "March Against Death".
Dave Thomas opens his first restaurant in a former steakhouse in downtown Columbus, Ohio. He names the chain Wendy's after his 8-year-old daughter Melinda Lou (nicknamed Wendy by her siblings).
 November 17 – Cold War: Negotiators from the Soviet Union and the United States meet in Helsinki, to begin the SALT I negotiations aimed at limiting the number of strategic weapons on both sides.
 November 19 – Apollo program: Apollo 12 astronauts Pete Conrad and Alan Bean land at Oceanus Procellarum ("Ocean of Storms"), becoming the third and fourth humans to walk on the Moon.
 November 20
Vietnam War: The Plain Dealer (Cleveland, Ohio) publishes explicit photographs of dead villagers from the My Lai massacre in Vietnam.
Occupation of Alcatraz: A group of Native American activists calling themselves "Indians of All Tribes" begin an 18-month occupation of Alcatraz Island as surplus federal land, to call attention to U.S. policies and treaty obligations to Native Americans and their tribal communities.
 November 21 
U.S. President Richard Nixon and Japanese Premier Eisaku Satō agree in Washington, D.C., to the return of Okinawa to Japanese control in 1972. Under the terms of the agreement, the U.S. retains rights to military bases on the island, but they must be nuclear-free.
The United States Senate votes down the Supreme Court nomination of Clement Haynsworth, the first such rejection since 1930.
 November 22 – College Football: Michigan ends Ohio State's 22-game winning streak with a 24–12 upset at Ann Arbor, denying the Buckeyes their second consecutive national championship. 
 November 24 – Apollo program: The Apollo 12 spacecraft splashes down safely in the Pacific Ocean, ending the second manned mission to the Moon.
 November 25 – John Lennon returns his MBE medal to protest the British government's support of the U.S. war in Vietnam.

December
 December 1 – Chicago: Blues musician Magic Sam dies at the age of 32 of a heart attack. 
 December 1 – Vietnam War: The first draft lottery in the United States is held since World War II (on January 4, 1970, The New York Times will run a long article, "Statisticians Charge Draft Lottery Was Not Random").
 December 2 – The Boeing 747 jumbo jet makes its debut. It carries 191 people, most of them reporters and photographers, from Seattle to New York City.
 December 4 – Black Panther Party members Fred Hampton and Mark Clark are shot dead in their sleep during a raid by 14 Chicago police officers.
 December 6 
 The Altamont Free Concert is held at the Altamont Speedway in northern California. Hosted by the Rolling Stones, it is an attempt at a "Woodstock West" and is best known for the uproar of violence that occurred. It is viewed by many as the "end of the sixties."
College football: #1 ranked Texas rallies from 14–0 deficit with two fourth quarter touchdowns to edge #2 Arkansas 15–14 at Fayetteville in a game attended by President of the United States Richard Nixon and several high-ranking government dignitaries, including future President George H. W. Bush. The victory clinches the national championship of the coaches poll for the Longhorns; they would win the Associated Press national championship by defeating Notre Dame 21–17 in the Cotton Bowl on New Year's Day. 
 December 7 – Frosty the Snowman airs for the first time on CBS.
 December 12 – The Piazza Fontana bombing in Italy (Strage di Piazza Fontana) takes place. A U.S. Navy officer and C.I.A. agent, David Carrett, is later investigated for possible involvement.
  December 28 – The Young Lords take over the First Spanish Methodist Church in East Harlem.

Undated
 The first Gap store opens in San Francisco.
 Reported as being the year the first strain of the AIDS virus (HIV) migrated to the United States via Haiti.
 The Water Rights Determination and Administration Act is passed in Colorado.
 Fall – First-generation Dodge Challenger automobile introduced in the United States.
 Women are allowed membership in the Future Farmers of America (the later National FFA Organization).
 Arthur Treacher's Fish and Chips is founded by S. Robert Davis and Dave Thomas and its first location in Columbus, Ohio opens for business.

Ongoing
 Cold War (1947–1991)
 Space Race (1957–1975)
 Vietnam War, U.S. involvement (1964–1973)
 Détente (c. 1969–1979)

Births

 January 1
 Morris Chestnut, African American actor and producer
 Verne Troyer, film actor (d. 2018)
 Mr. Lawrence, animator, writer, voice actor, and comedian
 January 2 
 Robby Gordon, race car driver
 Tommy Morrison, boxer and actor (d. 2013)
 Christy Turlington, fashion model
 January 3 – Lorenzo Fertitta, entrepreneur, casino executive and sports promoter
 January 4 
 Corie Blount, basketball player and coach
 Marla Runyan, runner and long jumper
 January 5 
 Marilyn Manson, born Brian Warner, rock musician and painter
 Shea Whigham, actor
 January 6
 Aron Eisenberg, screen actor and filmmaker (d. 2019) 
 Norman Reedus, screen actor and model
 January 7 – Rex Lee, actor 
 January 8 – J. Hunter Johnson, game designer, author and translator
 January 14
 Jason Bateman, actor, director and producer
 Dave Grohl, rock singer-/songwriter
 January 17 – Michael Moynihan, journalist and publisher
 January 18
 Dave Bautista, actor, mixed martial artist and wrestler
 Jesse L. Martin, actor and singer
 January 19 
 Junior Seau, American football player (d. 2012)
 Casey Sherman, journalist and author
 January 20 – Patrick K. Kroupa,  writer and hacker
 January 21 – M. K. Hobson, speculative fiction author
 January 27 – Patton Oswalt, stand-up comedian, writer, actor and voice artist
 January 28 
 Doug Ericksen, politician and lobbyist (d. 2021)
 Kathryn Morris, actress
 Mo Rocca, humorist, journalist and actor
 February 1
 Andrew Breitbart, journalist, author, and publisher (d. 2012)
 Brian Krause, actor and screenwriter
 Patrick Wilson, drummer 
 February 3 – Beau Biden, attorney and politician, son of President Joe Biden (d. 2015)
 February 9
 Ian Eagle, sports announcer
 Tom Scharpling, comedian, television writer and producer 
 February 11 
 Jennifer Aniston, actress, film director and producer
 Bill Warner, motorcycle racer and world motorcycle land speed record holder (d. 2013)
 February 13 
 Joyce DiDonato, opera singer
 Bryan Thomas Schmidt, science fiction author and editor
 February 15 – Birdman, born Bryan Brooks, African American rapper, entertainer and record producer
 February 19 – Burton C. Bell, rock vocalist/lyricist
 February 22
 Thomas Jane, screen actor and comic books producer
 Clinton Kelly, fashion consultant and television host
 February 28 
 Robert Sean Leonard, actor
 Pat Monahan, singer and lead vocalist of Train
 March 1 – Litefoot, Native American actor
 March 4
 Chaz Bono, child actor and LGBT rights activist
 Thomas McDermott Jr., 20th mayor of Hammond, Indiana 
 Adrian Wojnarowski, sports columnist and reporter
 March 5 – Kelley Moore, American television personality, event planner and author
 March 7 – Todd Williams, long-distance runner
 March 10 – Paget Brewster, screen actress and voice artist
 March 11 – Terrence Howard, actor and singer
 March 12 – Jake Tapper, journalist
 March 13 – Kevin Samuels, internet personality (d. 2022)
 March 19 – Connor Trinneer, actor
 March 27

 Kevin Corrigan, screen actor
 Pauley Perrette, screen actress
 March 28 
 Rodney Atkins, country singer-songwriter
 Jake Adelstein, journalist 
 March 29 
 Jeff Blackshear, American football player (d. 2019)
 Ted Lieu, politician, U.S. Representative
 April 4 – Mo Cowan, U.S. Senator from Massachusetts in 2013
 April 6 
 Bret Boone, baseball player
 Paul Rudd, actor, comedian, writer and producer
 April 9 – Debbie Schlussel, political commentator and film critic
 April 10 – Billy Jayne, actor
 April 12 – Michael Jackson, former NFL wide receiver (d. 2017)
 April 16 – Frank J. Mrvan, politician
 April 18 – C. Dale Young, poet
 May 3 – Daryl F. Mallett, author and actor
 May 4 – Christina Billotte, musician
 May 12
Kim Fields, actress
Kevin Nalty, comedian and blogger
 May 14 – Danny Wood, singer
 May 15 – Emmitt Smith, American football player
 May 21 – George LeMieux, U.S. Senator from Florida from 2009 to 2011
 May 25 
Anne Heche, actress (d. 2022)
Stacy London, fashion consultant and media personality
 May 26 – Siri Lindley, triathlete
 June 2 – Kurt Abbott, baseball player
 June 10 – Kasim Reed, lawyer and politician
 June 11
Steven Drozd, singer-songwriter 
Kip Miller, ice hockey player
 June 14
 Brooks Ashmanskas, stage actor
 Kyle Hebert, voice actor
 June 16
 Sam Register, television producer and businessman
 MC Ren, rapper
 June 17 – Amy Keating Rogers, television producer and writer
 June 19
Thomas Breitling, journalist and businessman
Lara Spencer, journalist
 June 21 – Pat Sansone, guitarist
 June 23 – Martin Klebba, actor
 June 24 – Rich Eisen, television journalist
 June 25 – Storm Large, singer and actress
 June 26 – Mike Myers, baseball pitcher
 June 27 – Heather Bresch, business executive, CEO of Mylan
 June 28 – Garth Snow, ice hockey player and manager
 July 2
 Matthew Cox, criminal
 Tony Touch, hip hop break dancer, singer-songwriter, producer and DJ
 July 3 – Shawnee Smith, screen actress and rock singer
 July 4
Al Golden, American football player and coach
Todd Marinovich, American football player and coach
Jordan Sonnenblick, teacher and novelist
 July 5 – John LeClair, hockey player
 July 6
 Beverly McClellan, singer and reality talent show finalist (The Voice) (d. 2018)
 Christopher Scarver, serial killer
 Brian Van Holt, screen actor
 July 7
 Keith Baker, game designer and fantasy novelist
 Cree Summer, actress, voice actress and singer
 July 8 – George Fisher, vocalist (Cannibal Corpse)
 July 10
 Gale Harold, screen actor
 Ken Wickham, author
 July 13 – Ken Jeong, actor, comedian and physician
 July 14 – Billy Herrington, gay pornographic actor (d. 2018)
 July 15 – Chris Wyse, bassist of Owl and The Cult
 July 18 – Elizabeth Gilbert, author
 July 19
 Chris Kratt, educational nature show host
 Courtenay Taylor, voice artist
 July 20 – Josh Holloway, screen actor and model
 July 21 – Godfrey, comedian and actor
 July 22
 Jason Becker, heavy metal guitarist (Cacophony)
 James Arnold Taylor, voice artist
 July 23 
 John Cariani, actor and playwright
 Raphael Warnock, pastor and junior senator from Georgia
 July 24 – Jennifer Lopez, actress and singer
 July 25 – Jason Harris Katz, voice artist and television host
 July 27 – Triple H (aka Paul Levesque), wrestler
 July 28 
 Alexis Arquette, born Robert Arquette, screen actress (d. 2016)
 Dana White, businessman and president of Ultimate Fighting Championship
 July 29 – Timothy Omundson, screen actor
 August 1 – David Wain, comedian, writer, actor and director
 August 4 – Michael DeLuise, screen actor and director
 August 5 – Kenny Irwin Jr., NASCAR driver (d. 2000)
 August 6
 Jonathan Aibel, scriptwriter 
 Elliott Smith, singer-songwriter (d. 2003)
 August 9 – Troy Percival, baseball player
 August 15 – John Fetterman, politician
 August 16 – Kate Higgins, voice artist and pianist
 August 17
 Christian Laettner, basketball player
 Donnie Wahlberg, singer and actor (New Kids on the Block)
 August 18
 Everlast, singer, rapper and songwriter
 Edward Norton, actor, film director, screenwriter and social activist
 Christian Slater, actor, voice artist and producer
 Timothy Snyder, historian 
 August 19
 Nate Dogg, African American rapper (d. 2011)
 Doug Langdale, screenwriter, producer and actor
 Paula Jai Parker, actress and comedian
 Matthew Perry, screen actor
 Clay Walker, country singer
 August 26 – Glenn Berger, scriptwriter
 August 27 – Avril Haines, lawyer, Director of National Intelligence
 August 28 – Jack Black, actor and musician
 August 30 – Kent Osborne, actor and producer
 August 31 – Andrew Cunanan, serial killer (suicide 1997)
 September 2
 Cedric "K-Ci" Hailey, R&B singer
 Dave Naz, photographer
 September 4 – Kristen Wilson, screen actress
 September 5 – Dweezil Zappa, actor and musician
 September 6 – CeCe Peniston, singer 
 September 7
 Angie Everhart, actress and model
 Diane Farr, screen actress
 Jimmy Urine (Euringer), electropunk singer 
 September 11 – Crystal Lewis, Christian musician
 September 13
 Dominic Fumusa, actor
 Tyler Perry, actor, film director and screenwriter
 September 17 – Matthew Settle, screen actor
 September 19 – Michael Symon, chef and television personality
 September 24
 Shawn "Clown" Crahan, rock percussionist 
 DeVante Swing, music producer
 September 25
 Bill Simmons, sports columnist
 Hal Sparks, actor, writer, comedian and political commentator 
 September 29 – Erika Eleniak, model and actress
 September 30 – Chris Von Erich, professional wrestler (d. 1991)
 October 1 – Zach Galifianakis, actor and stand-up comedian
 October 2 – Mitch English, actor and television host
 October 3 – Gwen Stefani, singer, actress and television host
 October 7
 Karen L. Nyberg, space engineer and astronaut
 DJ Qbert (Richard Quitevis), turntablist
 October 8 – Julia Ann, pornographic actress
 October 10 
 Loren Bouchard, voice artist, animator and producer
 Benjamin Crump, civil rights lawyer
 Brett Favre, American football player
 Molly Kiely, cartoonist)
 Wendi McLendon-Covey, comic screen actress
 October 13
 Rhett Akins, country singer
 Nancy Kerrigan, figure skater
 Cady McClain, actress and director 
 October 14 – David Strickland, screen actor (suicide 1999)
 October 15 – Kim Raver, screen actress
 October 16
 Roy Hargrove, jazz trumpeter (d. 2018)
 Wendy Wilson, singer and television personality
 October 17
 Wood Harris, screen actor
 Nancy Sullivan, screen actress
 October 19
 Vanessa Marshall, actress and voice artist
 Trey Parker, voice artist, comedian, screenwriter, composer, director and producer
 October 20 – Juan González, baseball player
 October 21 – David Phelps, Christian music vocalist, songwriter and vocal arranger
 October 22 – Spike Jonze, film director
 October 23 – Sanjay Gupta, neurosurgeon and medical reporter
 October 25
 Nika Futterman, actress and voice artist 
 Alex Webster, death metal bassist
 October 27 – Jun Pino, artist and photographer
 November 2 – Reginald Arvizu ('Fieldy Snuts'), nu metal bassist
 November 4
 Sean Combs (Puff Daddy, P. Diddy), African American rapper and entrepreneur
 Matthew McConaughey, film actor
 November 7 – Michelle Clunie, screen actress
 November 8 – Jonathan Slavin, actor and activist
 November 9
 Sandra Denton, African American rapper 
 Allison Wolfe, punk rock singer-songwriter
 November 10 – Ellen Pompeo, screen actress
 November 12
 Ian Bremmer, political scientist
 Rob Schrab, actor and comic book creator
 November 13
 John Belluso, dramatist (d. 2006)
 Stephen Full, actor and comedian
 Josh Mancell, composer and instrumentalist
 November 18
 Sam Cassell, basketball player
 Rocket Ismail, American football player
 Duncan Sheik, singer-songwriter, guitarist, and actor
 November 19 – Erika Alexander, African American actress
 November 20
 Dabo Swinney, college football coach
 Meredith Whitney, business executive
 November 21 – Ken Griffey Jr., baseball player
 November 26 – Kara Walker, African American artist
 November 28
 Colman Domingo, African American actor and dramatist
 Lexington Steele (Clifton Todd Britt), African American pornographic actor and director
 November 29
 Chris Baker, race car driver
 Kasey Keller, soccer player
 November 30 – David Auburn, dramatist
 December 1 – Richard Carrier, historian
 December 4 – Jay-Z (Shawn Corey Carter), African American rapper
 December 5 – Alex Kapp Horner, television actress
 December 7 – Patrice O'Neal, African American comedian and radio personality (d. 2011)
 December 8 – Kerry Earnhardt, race car driver 
 December 9 
 Jakob Dylan, rock singer-songwriter
 Lori Greiner, investor, entrepreneur and television personality
 December 11 – Sean Grande, basketball announcer
 December 14 – Archie Kao, screen actor
 December 15 – Rick Law, illustrator and producer
 December 16 – Adam Riess, astrophysicist, recipient of Nobel Prize in Physics in 2011
 December 17
 Laurie Holden, actress, producer, model and human rights activist
 Chuck Liddell, mixed martial arts fighter
 December 18 – Joe Randa, baseball player and radio talk-show host
 December 19
 Lauren Sánchez, news anchor
 Kristy Swanson, screen actress
 December 20 – Bobby Phills, basketball player (d. 2000)
 December 23
 Greg Biffle, race car driver
 Martha Byrne, actress and singer
 Rodney Culver, American football player (d. 1996)
 Rob Pelinka, sports agent
 December 24
 Brad Anderson, wrestler
 Leavander Johnson, lightweight boxer (d. 2005)
 Clinton McKinnon, rock saxophonist
 Chen Yueling, race walker
 Jonathan Zittrain, academic internet lawyer
 Michael Zucchet, economist and politician, Mayor of San Diego
 December 27 
 Chyna, professional wrestler (d. 2016)
 Sarah Vowell, historian, author, journalist, essayist, social commentator and actress
 December 30 – Matt Goldman, record producer
 Undated
 Max Gottlieb, American film and Broadway theatre producer, production designer, screenwriter, and film director

Deaths

 January 1 – Barton MacLane, screen actor (b. 1902)
 January 2 – Gilbert Miller, theatrical producer (b. 1884)
 January 3 
 Commodore Cochran, Olympic sprinter (b. 1902)
 Howard McNear, screen character actor (b. 1905)
 January 17
 Bunchy Carter, political activist (b. 1942)
 John Huggins, political activist (b. 1945)
 January 27 – Charles Winninger, actor (b. 1884)
 January 29 – Allen Dulles, director of the Central Intelligence Agency (b. 1893)
 February 3 – Al Taliaferro, Disney comics artist (b. 1905)
 February 5 
 Conrad Hilton Jr., socialite and hotel business heir (b. 1926)
 Thelma Ritter, comedy actress (b. 1902)
 February 9 – George "Gabby" Hayes, Western film actor (b. 1885)
 February 14 – Vito Genovese, mobster (b. 1897 in Italy)
 February 15 – Pee Wee Russell, jazz clarinetist (b. 1906)
 February 17 – Paul Barbarin, jazz drummer (b. 1899)
 February 27 
 John Boles, film actor (b. 1895)
 William T. Innes, writer, ichthyologist and publisher (b. 1874)
 March 3 – Fred Alexander, tennis player (b. 1880)
 March 4 – Nicholas Schenck, film impresario (b. 1881 in Russia)
 March 9
 Charles Brackett, novelist and screenwriter (b. 1892)
 Richard Crane, screen character actor (b. 1918)
 March 11 – Daniel E. Barbey, admiral (b. 1889)
 March 18 – Barbara Bates, film actress, suicide (b. 1925)
 March 21 – Pinky Higgins, baseball player and manager (b. 1909)
 March 25 – Max Eastman, writer (b. 1883)
 March 26 – John Kennedy Toole, novelist, suicide (b. 1937)
 March 28 – Dwight D. Eisenhower, 34th President of the United States from 1953 to 1961 (b. 1890)
 April 4 – Félix Conde Falcón, army soldier, recipient of the Medal of Honor (b. 1938)
 April 5 – Shelby Storck, television producer (b. 1917)
 April 10 – Harley Earl, automotive designer and business executive (b. 1893)
 April 20 – Benny Benjamin, urban and jazz drummer (b. 1925)
 May 1 – Ella Logan, actress and singer (b. 1910 in Scotland)
 May 14
 Enid Bennett, silent film actress (b. 1893 in Australia)
 Walter Pitts, logician and cognitive psychologist (b. 1923)
 May 15
 William Gould, action film actor (b. 1886 in Canada)
 Robert Rayford, HIV/AIDS victim (b. 1953)
 May 18 – Walter Gropius, Modernist architect (b. 1883 in Germany)
 May 20
 Alex Rackley, political activist (b. 1949)
 Fred Sherman, film actor (b. 1905)
 May 21 – William Lincoln Bakewell, explorer (b. 1888)
 May 23 – Jimmy McHugh, song composer (b. 1894)
 May 24
 Paul Birch, actor (b. 1912)
 Mitzi Green, child actress (b. 1920)
 May 26 – Henry Rago, poet and editor (b. 1915)
 May 27 – Jeffrey Hunter, screen actor (b. 1926)
 June 8 – Robert Taylor, American actor (b. 1911)
 June 11 – John L. Lewis, President of the United Mine Workers of America from 1920 to 1960 (b. 1889)
 June 18 – Edgar Anderson, botanist (b. 1897)
 June 19 – Natalie Talmadge, silent film actress (b. 1896)
 June 24 – Willy Ley, scientific popularizer (b. 1906 in Germany)
 June 28 
 Charles Carpenter, Episcopal bishop (b. 1899)
 Gerald Fitzgerald, Roman Catholic priest (b. 1894)
 June 30 
 Roman Richard Atkielski, Roman Catholic bishop (b. 1899)
 Max Fabian, cinematographer (b. 1891 in Poland)
 July 2 – Michael DiBiase, wrestler (b 1923)
 July 5
 Ben Alexander, film actor (b. 1911)
 Walter Gropius, architect (b. 1883 in Germany)
 Lambert Hillyer, film director (b. 1889)
 Leo McCarey, film director (b. 1898)
 July 7
 Charlotte Armstrong, fiction writer (b. 1905)
 Gladys Swarthout, operatic mezzo-soprano, died in Italy (b. 1900)
 July 17 – Harry Benham, silent film actor (b. 1884)
 July 18
 Mary Jo Kopechne, teacher, secretary and political campaign specialist, drowned in automobile accident (b. 1940)
 Barbara Pepper, actress (b. 1915)
 July 21 – A. D. King, African American civil rights activist and Baptist minister, accidental drowning (b. 1930)
 July 26 – Raymond Walburn, character actor (b. 1897)
 July 28 – Frank Loesser, songwriter (b. 1910)
 August 1 – Donald Keith, silent film actor (b. 1910)
 August 9 – Tate–LaBianca murders
 Jay Sebring, celebrity hair stylist (b. 1933)
 Sharon Tate, screen actress and model (b. 1943)
 August 17
 Otto Stern, physicist, recipient of Nobel Prize in Physics in 1943 (b. 1888 in Germany)
 Ludwig Mies van der Rohe, architect (b. 1886 in Germany)
 August 18 – Mildred Davis, silent film actress (b. 1901)
 August 31 – Rocky Marciano, heavyweight boxer (b. 1923)
 September 3 – John Lester, cricketer (b. 1871 in the United Kingdom)
 September 16 – Henry Fairfield Osborn Jr., conservationist (b. 1887)
 September 17 – Greye La Spina, dramatist and short story writer (b. 1880)
 September 18 – Hermann Eisner, Wisconsin politician, Austro-Hungarian emigrant (b. 1898)
 September 22 – Rachel Davis Harris, African American librarian (b. 1869)
 September 24 – Warren Sturgis McCulloch, neurophysiologist and cybernetician (b. 1898)
 September 26 – John Thomas Kennedy, general and Medal Honour recipient (b. 1885)
 October 3 – Skip James, blues singer (b. 1902) 
 October 6 – Walter Hagen, golfer (b. 1892)
 October 7 – Johnnie Morris, vaudeville and film actor and comedian (b. 1887)
 October 14 – Arnie Herber, American football player (Green Bay Packers) (b. 1910)
 October 15 – Rod La Rocque, film actor (b. 1898)
 October 21 – Jack Kerouac, novelist and poet (b. 1922)
 October 29 – Pops Foster, African American jazz string bass player (b. 1892)
 November 1 – Pauline Bush, silent film actress (b. 1886)
 November 5 – Lloyd Corrigan, screen actor and director (b. 1900)
 November 8
 Dave O'Brien, film actor (b. 1912)
 Vesto Slipher, astronomer (b. 1875)
 November 11 – Frank Mills, politician in Ohio legislature (b. 1904)
 November 12 – William F. Friedman, cryptanalyst (b. 1891 in Russia)
 November 13 – Henry A. Roemer, business executive (b. 1884)
 November 15 – Roy D'Arcy, silent and sound film actor (b. 1894)
 November 18 – Joseph P. Kennedy Sr., political patriarch and businessman (b. 1888)
 November 28 – Roy Barcroft, Western film actor (b. 1902)
 December 1 – Magic Sam, Chicago blues guitarist and songwriter (b. 1937)
 December 3 – Ruth White, actress (b. 1914)
 December 4 – Black Panther Party activists, killed in police raid
 Mark Clark (b. 1947)
 Fred Hampton (b. 1948)
 December 7 – Lefty O'Doul, baseball player (b. 1897)
 December 13 – Spencer Williams, African American screen actor and filmmaker (b. 1893)
 December 23 – Donald Foster, television actor (b. 1889)
 December 24
 Cortelia Clark, African American blues singer and guitarist (b. 1906)
 Seabury Quinn, government lawyer, journalist and pulp magazine author (b. 1889)
 December 31 – Joseph Yablonski, labor leader, murdered (b. 1910)

See also
List of American films of 1969
Timeline of United States history (1950–1969)

References

External links
 

 
1960s in the United States
United States
United States
Years of the 20th century in the United States